The Tuttles of Tahiti is a 1942 American adventure comedy romance film directed by Charles Vidor and starring Charles Laughton and Jon Hall. It was based on the novel No More Gas by James Norman Hall and Charles Nordhoff.

According to one reviewer the film was "not really a South Seas movie so much as a “wacky family” tale, with Hall as the son of paterfamilias Charles Laughton. You can see what the filmmakers are going for but despite a healthy budget and talented people involved...the film is marred by odd decisions (the film noir-like photography, Laughton’s make-up, the lack of a decent romance and action for Hall). It lost RKO money, which may explain why this was the last time Hall depicted a Pacific Islander on screen."

Plot
When merchant sailor Chester Tuttle (Jon Hall) returns home to Tahiti after several years away, his family, headed by Jonas Tuttle (Charles Laughton), welcomes him with open arms. The Tuttles are a happy-go-lucky bunch who give little thought to the future and do as little work as necessary. Jonas often gets loans, which he never gets around to paying back, from Dr. Blondin (Victor Francen). Chester has brought with him a fighting rooster for Jonas's cockfight with the more industrious and prosperous Emily (Florence Bates).

Shrewd businessman Jensen (Curt Bois) persuades the doctor to transfer Jonas's debt to him. Jonas is so sure that Chester's rooster will win that he willingly signs a mortgage for the rundown family mansion and bets everything on the outcome. However, the bird turns out be a coward and flees the ring without a fight.

Chester notices that Emily's daughter Tamara (Peggy Drake) has grown into a beautiful young woman, but the young lovers realize that Emily will never sanction Tamara's marriage to a penniless wastrel.

To raise the mortgage payment, Chester, his brothers and nephew go fishing on their boat. When a storm comes up, they are presumed lost. However, not only are they safe, they find an abandoned ship. They bring it in, and under salvage laws, they are now its owners. Jensen buys it and its cargo for 400,000 francs, an enormous sum.

Ignoring Emily's advice to invest the money, Jonas deposits it in a joint checking account, withdraws just enough to pay back Dr. Blondin, and gives checkbooks to everyone in the family. With their new wealth, Chester is able to marry Tamara. However, creditors descend on Jonas, and the spendthrift Tuttles soon spend the rest of their money very quickly.

When Jensen comes to collect the mortgage, Jonas cannot find the money he had saved for Blondin, and Jensen takes possession of the mansion. While chasing Chester's rooster, he finds the misplaced money and triumphantly gives it to Blondin, saving the Tuttle home. In the end, Blondin gives Jonas a new loan to buy gas for the fishing boat.

Cast
Charles Laughton as Jonas Tuttle
Jon Hall as Chester Tuttle
Peggy Drake as Tamara
Victor Francen as Dr. Blondin
Gene Reynolds as Ru Tuttle, Jonas's grandson
Florence Bates as Emily
Curt Bois as Jensen
Adeline De Walt Reynolds as Mama Ruau, Jonas's mother
Ray Mala as Nat

Reception
The film recorded a loss of $170,000.

References

External links

1942 films
1942 comedy films
RKO Pictures films
American comedy films
American black-and-white films
Films scored by Roy Webb
Films directed by Charles Vidor
Films set in French Polynesia
Tahitian culture
Films produced by Sol Lesser
Films based on American novels
1940s American films
1940s English-language films